Des Newton may refer to:

 Des Newton (model maker) (1942–2009), British maker of model ships in bottles
 Des Newton (Gaelic footballer), former Gaelic footballer and manager from County Roscommon, Ireland